Carmentina iridesma is a species of sedge moth in the genus Carmentina. It was described by Edward Meyrick in 1930. It is found on the Solomon Islands.

References

Moths described in 1930
Glyphipterigidae